Fred Henry Davis (May 18, 1894 – June 20, 1937) was an American attorney and politician from the state of Florida, serving as Chief Justice of the Supreme Court of Florida from 1933 until 1935.

Early life and military service 
Davis was born on May 18, 1894, in Greenville, South Carolina, though he settled in Tallahassee, Florida, with his family at an early age. He was admitted to the Florida Bar in 1914 and became a practicing attorney in Wakulla County, Florida.

In 1917, Davis, a Democrat, became the Special Assistant United States Attorney for the Northern District of Florida. He resigned the same year to enlist in the Florida Army National Guard, serving as a private with the 124th Infantry during World War I, though he did not go overseas with the American Expeditionary Force. On December 10, 1918, Davis was discharged from the United States Army and was sent to Camp Hancock, near Augusta, Georgia, to begin his officers' training.

Davis quickly worked his way up the ranks, becoming a lieutenant and later a major in the Army Reserve Corps. Davis commanded Company M of the 124th Infantry, which, in 1924, was designated as the Governor's Guards, a historic infantry unit dating back to the Third Seminole War. Davis retired from the military in 1927.

Political career 
After his return to Florida from Camp Hancock in 1919, Davis was appointed as the Prosecuting Attorney for Leon County, Florida, by Governor Sidney Johnson Catts. In 1920, Davis was elected to the Florida House of Representatives, representing Leon County.

He was re-elected in 1922 and 1924. Davis also served as the special counsel for the Florida Railroad Commission in 1925 He was re-elected to the Florida House in 1926 and was selected Speaker of the Florida House of Representatives in 1927. He would only serve for a few months, however, as he was appointed the 24th Florida Attorney General on June 4, 1927, by Governor John W. Martin, finishing the term of J. B. Johnson, who had been appointed to a state circuit court. Davis was elected to a full term in 1928.

On March 9, 1931, Governor Doyle E. Carlton appointed Davis to the Supreme Court of Florida. Davis was selected as Chief Justice on January 10, 1933, serving in that role until January 8, 1935. He continued to serve on the bench until his death in 1937.

Personal life 
In 1921, Davis married Frances M. Chambers. They had two daughters Marilyn and Hazel D.

Davis was a practicing Methodist. He was a member of many veterans' organizations, including the American Legion, the Military Order of the World Wars, the Reserve Officers Association, and the Sons of Confederate Veterans. Additionally, Davis was also a member of several fraternal orders, namely the Freemasons, the Knights Templar, the Shriners, Elks, Lions, Odd Fellows, and Phi Alpha Delta.

Death
On June 20, 1937, Davis died of a sudden heart attack while on a visit to Jacksonville, Florida. He is buried in Tallahassee's Old City Cemetery.

References

Florida Attorneys General
Speakers of the Florida House of Representatives
Democratic Party members of the Florida House of Representatives
Justices of the Florida Supreme Court
1894 births
1937 deaths
20th-century American judges
People from Greenville, South Carolina
People from Tallahassee, Florida
Florida National Guard personnel
Military personnel from Florida
American military personnel of World War I
National Guard (United States) officers
Assistant United States Attorneys
Methodists from Florida
American Freemasons
Knights Templar
Chief Justices of the Florida Supreme Court